Caladenia atrochila is a plant in the orchid family Orchidaceae and is endemic to Tasmania. It is a ground orchid with a single hairy leaf and flowers that are whitish or pinkish on the front, but yellowish-green on the back and a cream-coloured labellum with dark red markings.

Description
Caladenia atrochila is a terrestrial, perennial, deciduous, herb which grows singly or in small, loose groups.

It has three distinct lobes and is erect near its base then more or less horizontal. There are two rows of yellow calli with dark red stalks in the centre of the labellum. Flowering occurs in November but the flowers are only open for a day or two before self-pollinating.

Taxonomy and naming
Caladenia atrochila was first formally described by David Jones in 1998 and the description was published in Australian Orchid Research. The type specimen was collected in Callaghans Scrub near the Arthur River. The specific epithet (atrochila) is derived from the Latin word ater meaning "black" and the Ancient Greek word cheilos meaning "lip" referring to the dark lines on the labellum.

Distribution and habitat
This caladenia is only known from dense forest in coastal and near-coastal areas of western Tasmania.

References

atrochila
Plants described in 1998
Endemic orchids of Australia
Orchids of Tasmania
Taxa named by David L. Jones (botanist)